Rhee Ji-young is a South Korean voice actress. She joined On-Media's voice acting division in 1995.

Role

Broadcast TV
 Ouran High School Host Club (Korea TV Edition, Tooniverse) - Haruhi Fujioka
 Ashita no Nadja (Korea TV Edition, Tooniverse) - Nadja Applefield
 Fushigiboshi no Futagohime (Korea TV Edition, Tooniverse) - Rein
 Magical Girl Lyrical Nanoha (Korea TV Edition, Tooniverse) - Fate Testarossa
 Mr. Bogus (Korea Edition) - Tommy's Mom and Additional Voices
 Full Metal Panic? Fumoffu (Korea TV Edition, Tooniverse) - Teletha Tessa Testarossa
 Gals! (Korea TV Edition, Tooniverse) - Aya Hoshino
 Great Teacher Onizuka (Korea TV Edition, Tooniverse) - Azusa Fuyutsuki
 Midori Days (Korea TV Edition, Tooniverse) - Midori Kasugano
 Chrono Crusade (Korea TV Edition, Tooniverse) - Rosette Christopher
 Pita-Ten (Korea TV Edition, Tooniverse) - Shia
 Rockman EXE (Korea TV Edition, Tooniverse) - Rockman
 Air Master (Korea TV Edition, Tooniverse) - Mina Nakanotani 
 UFO Baby (Korea TV Edition, Tooniverse) - Miyu Kōzuki
 Sugar Sugar Rune (Korea TV Edition, Tooniverse) - Cinnamon Meilleure
 Shugo Chara! (Korea TV Edition, Tooniverse) - Tadase Hotori
 Mahojin Guru Guru (Korea TV Edition, Tooniverse) - Juju / Toma
 To Heart (Korea TV Edition, Tooniverse) - Aoi Matsubara
 Fushigi Yuugi (Korea TV Edition, Tooniverse) - Soi
 Taruto (Korea TV Edition, Animax) - Chitose
 Widget (Korea TV Edition) - Christine, Additional Voices
 My Little Pony: Friendship Is Magic（Korea TV Edition Tooniverse）- Fluttershy

See also
On-Media Voice Acting Division

References

External links
Tears of Blood, Magna Carta, PlayStation 2 game featuring the voice of Rhee Ji Yeong as the anime character "Maya"
Image of Maya, Rhee Ji Yeong's anime character in Tears of Blood, Magna Carta

Homepage

Living people
South Korean voice actresses
Year of birth missing (living people)